Kim Sun-woo (born 6 October 1996) is a South Korean modern pentathlete. She has qualified for the 2016 Summer Olympics. She attended .

References

External links 
 

1996 births
Living people
South Korean female modern pentathletes
Modern pentathletes at the 2016 Summer Olympics
Modern pentathletes at the 2020 Summer Olympics
Olympic modern pentathletes of South Korea
Asian Games medalists in modern pentathlon
Modern pentathletes at the 2014 Asian Games
Modern pentathletes at the 2018 Asian Games
Asian Games gold medalists for South Korea
Asian Games bronze medalists for South Korea
Medalists at the 2014 Asian Games
Medalists at the 2018 Asian Games
Korea National Sport University alumni
20th-century South Korean women
21st-century South Korean women
World Modern Pentathlon Championships medalists